Peggy Onkutlwile Serame is a Motswana politician who has been serving as Minister of Finance in the government of President Mokgweetsi Masisi since April 2021.

Political career 
Prior to being appointed to the cabinet, Serame worked as a microeconomist at the Ministry of Finance. Serame served as Minister of Investment, Trade and Industry from March 2020 until April 2021.

Other activities 
 World Bank, Ex-Officio Member of the Board of Governors (since 2021)
 Multilateral Investment Guarantee Agency (MIGA), World Bank Group, Ex-Officio Member of the Board of Governors (since 2021)

Personal life 
Serame has a daughter named Dineo Diana Tamia Serame and Kabelo Serame.

References

External links 

 

Living people
Year of birth missing (living people)
Finance ministers of Botswana
Members of the National Assembly (Botswana)
Botswana Democratic Party politicians
21st-century Botswana women politicians
21st-century Botswana politicians
People from Gaborone
Botswana economists
Microeconomists
Women economists
Female finance ministers
University of Botswana alumni
21st-century economists